The Estadio Akron, formerly known as the  Estadio Omnilife and Estadio Chivas (Estadio Chivas), is a multipurpose stadium in Zapopan, near Guadalajara, in the Mexican state of Jalisco, that is used mostly for football matches. It is the home of Liga MX side C.D. Guadalajara. It is part of the JVC complex, and has a capacity of 48,071. Construction started in February 2004, but due to financial problems and other issues, the stadium's completion was delayed for a number of years.

The stadium hosted its first major international event with the first leg of the 2010 Finals of the Copa Libertadores, and hosted the 2011 Pan American Games opening and closing ceremonies. The stadium's artificial field caused great controversy, drawing criticism from many notable players, and in May 2012, it was announced that the stadium would replace the artificial turf with natural grass. The stadium is also expected to host some matches for the 2026 FIFA World Cup.

History

In February 2004, C.D. Guadalajara announced that it would construct a new stadium of its own, intending to leave Estadio Jalisco. Construction on the stadium did not begin until May 2007.

The third public football match at the stadium was a friendly between Guadalajara and Manchester United on 30 July 2010. Guadalajara won the game 3–2, with the first goal at the stadium scored by Javier "Chicharito" Hernández playing for Guadalajara. This match was held to represent Hernández's transfer from Guadalajara to Manchester United, with Hernández playing the first half for Guadalajara and switching sides to Manchester United in the second half, thus symbolically sealing his transfer contract that had been signed in March 2010.

The stadium hosted 8 matches of the 2011 FIFA U-17 World Cup, including a semifinal, between Uruguay and Brazil.

It was also the venue of the opening and closing ceremonies of the 2011 Pan American Games, where it also hosted all the matches of both men's and women's football tournament.

In May 2012, following criticism regarding the artificial field, it was announced that the stadium would replace the artificial turf with natural grass. The replacement was complete by July.

In December 2017, the stadium changed its name from Estadio Omnilife to Estadio Akron, after signing a sponsorship deal with a car lubricants firm for 10 years.

2026 FIFA World Cup
Estadio Akron will host matches during the 2026 FIFA World Cup. During the event, the stadium will be temporarily renamed to "Guadalajara Stadium" in accordance with FIFA's policy on corporate sponsored names.

International matches

Mexico national football team

Images

References

External links 
 

C.D. Guadalajara
Football venues in Mexico
Sports venues in Guadalajara, Jalisco
Sports venues completed in 2010
Venues of the 2011 Pan American Games
Pan American Games opening ceremony stadiums
2026 FIFA World Cup Stadiums
Zapopan
2010 establishments in Mexico